Xankəndi or Khankendi may refer to:
 Stepanakert - the de facto capital of the self-proclaimed Republic of Artsakh
 Xankəndi, Ismailli - a village in the Ismailli District of Azerbaijan.
 Xankəndi, Shamakhi - a village in the Shamakhi District of Azerbaijan.

See also 
 Khan Kandi (disambiguation)